The Ceremonial county of Cornwall is one of the current official definitions of Cornwall. The ceremonial county includes the Isles of Scilly, which are not part of the Administrative county of Cornwall.

The exact date of the establishment of the ceremonial county is unknown, but is thought to be sometime around the closure of the last Stannary Parliament in 1753. A number of county institutions were established in the decades following.

The ceremonial county which had previously existed only at common-law was defined by statute by the Lieutenancies Act 1997.

References

Cornwall